Coleophora pallidiptera is a moth of the family Coleophoridae. It is found in China.

References

pallidiptera
Moths of Asia
Moths described in 1998